The 2001 NAIA Division I women's basketball tournament was the tournament held by the NAIA to determine the national champion of women's college basketball among its Division I members in the United States and Canada for the 2000–01 basketball season.

Two-time defending champions Oklahoma City defeated Auburn Montgomery in the championship game, 69–52, to claim the Stars' fourth NAIA national title. This would go on to be the third of four consecutive titles for Oklahoma City.

The tournament was played at the Oman Arena in Jackson, Tennessee.

Qualification

The tournament field remained fixed at thirty-two teams, with the top sixteen teams receiving seeds.

The tournament continued to utilize a simple single-elimination format.

Bracket

See also
2001 NAIA Division I men's basketball tournament
2001 NCAA Division I women's basketball tournament
2001 NCAA Division II women's basketball tournament
2001 NCAA Division III women's basketball tournament
2001 NAIA Division II women's basketball tournament

References

NAIA
NAIA Women's Basketball Championships
2001 in sports in Tennessee